Germacrone is a sesquiterpene which has been isolated from Geranium macrorrhizum.   It has shown antiviral properties in an animal model of influenza infection.

References

Sesquiterpenes